All Saints Church, Alrewas is a parish church in the village of Alrewas, Staffordshire in the United Kingdom. The church is situated in the north west of the village on the north side of the Trent & Mersey Canal. The church is a Grade I Listed Building. A church has stood on the current site since the 10th century. The current building was mainly built during the 13th, 14th, 16th and 19th centuries.

History

A church has stood on the current site since at least 822AD. The original building was believed to be made of timber with a roof of thatched reeds. Alrewas at the time was a flourishing settlement in the ownership of Ælfgar, Earl of Mercia and it remained the property of King John until he granted it to Roger de Somerville to be followed by the Griffiths and later, the Turtons.

The Normans replaced the simple wooden church with one of local stone which probably occupied the space in the present nave between the two arcades. The tower doorway, the north aisle door and the heavy rough hewn pieces of masonry in the north wall are the oldest remaining parts of the church dating from the original Norman building.

During the 13th century the fine Early English chancel was added to the church complete with lancet windows, and in the south wall a piscina, a sedilia and priest's door. The small window in the north wall had a bell hung by it which was rung at the Consecration of the Sacrament. The present nave and south aisle were built during the 14th century and the original Norman doorway in the north wall was retained. Other features of the 14th century include the 'horse shoe' arch separating nave from chancel and also the majestic tower, the old Norman west door being re-set at its base.

In the 16th century the church was added to with the insertion of clerestory windows which run the length of both nave and chancel. The beautiful carved timber roofs of the nave and south aisle were also constructed during this period.

In 1877 the chancel was restored, the Early English east window was changed and filled with new stained glass by Holiday. In 1891 the north aisle was built making the church symmetrical, the architect was Basil Champneys. The stained glass in the windows of the north aisle were by Charles Eamer Kempe. The chancel screen was erected in 1892. In 1866 the porch was rebuilt, above which is an old sundial and on the buttress to the right of the porch there is an ancient mass dial.

Notable features

The church during the medieval period was highly decorated with wall paintings. During the Reformation, these paintings were all whitewashed over. During restoration work in the 19th century it was discovered that some paintings still existed when the whitewash was removed and the remaining fragment can be seen on the north wall of the chancel.
The church has two ancient chests, once the repository of the Alrewas manorial court rolls. These chests probably date from the 14th century.
The octagonal font in the church with four lions at its base dates from the 15th century.
The carved wooden pulpit dates from 1639 and was provided during the Civil War period. It is one of the best examples of 17th-century woodwork in the county.
The oak altar table dates from 1638.
There are currently 8 bells in the church, recast in 1922 they replace previous castings from 1585, 1618 and 1711.
There are some fine monuments at the east end of the south aisle. Two are from the 18th century and one a little earlier. This part of the church was the chapel of the Turton family, who at one time were Lords of the Manor.

Present
The church is still active in the village community today and holds Sunday services with an 8am Holy Communion and a 10am Family Service. There is also a bell ringing group associated with the church.

The church also gives its name to the All Saints Bowling Club situated between the church and the Trent & Mersey canal at the rear of the church. There is also All Saints Church of England Primary School, which is the main primary school in Alrewas.

See also
Grade I listed churches in Staffordshire
Listed buildings in Alrewas

References

Church of England church buildings in Staffordshire
Grade I listed churches in Staffordshire